Precisionist (February 28, 1981 – September 27, 2006) was an American Hall of Fame Thoroughbred racehorse.

Race career
In 1985, Precisionist won the Strub Series at Santa Anita Park becoming only the fifth horse to win the Malibu Stakes, the San Fernando Stakes and the Charles H. Strub Stakes. Although he earned an Eclipse Award as a champion sprinter and was a Breeders' Cup sprint winner,  Precisionist was also a winner of races beyond a mile including Grade I races at 1¼ miles.

In 1986, Precisionist won the Woodward Stakes over Lady's Secret (eventual Horse of the Year). In the fall, Precisionist and Turkoman were the heavy favorites for the Breeders' Cup Classic but he ran second and third respectively to upset winner, Skywalker.

In 1988, overcoming both the 20-month layoff and a fracture to his left foreleg that was repaired with a pin, Precisionist set the current one-mile track record at Del Mar Racetrack in 1:33 1/5. William Donovan handled training duties for Precisionist's final start when he finished twelfth in the 1988 Sunny Isle Handicap at Calder Race Course.

Stud career
Retired initially at age 6, Precisionist proved nearly sterile, siring only four offspring in three foal crops. He produced three daughters and a son, all started and two were winners; none were stakes winners. His progeny earned a total of $34,230. He managed to become a one-time proven dam-sire when his daughter, Preciseness, produced the graded stakes winner Dawn Again, and his granddaughters had several stakes performers.

Retirement
As a result of his inability to reliably produce foals, his owners returned him to racing under trainer John Russell. He was permanently retired after a successful 1988 campaign. Several attempts were made to improve his fertility, but nothing worked to satisfaction. He was sent to live at a farm in Ocala, Florida where he remained until June 2006 when he was sent to the Old Friends, Inc. equine retirement center near Georgetown, Kentucky.

Death
Diagnosed with inoperable sinus tumors, Precisionist was euthanized on September 27, 2006. He was buried in his entirety at the Old Friends cemetery.

References
 Precisionist's pedigree and stats
 Old Friends official website

1981 racehorse births
2006 racehorse deaths
Breeders' Cup Sprint winners
Racehorses bred in Florida
Racehorses trained in the United States
Horse racing track record setters
Eclipse Award winners
United States Thoroughbred Racing Hall of Fame inductees
Thoroughbred family 11-g
Byerley Turk sire line
Old Friends Equine Retirement